Nina Petrovna Khrushcheva (14 April 1900 – 13 August 1984) was the second wife of the Soviet leader Nikita Khrushchev.

Biography
Nina Kukharchuk was born in the village of Wasylów, which was then part of the Russian Empire, but now in Poland. Her parents, Petro Vasyl'yovych Kukharchuk and Kateryna Petrivna Bondarchuk, were peasants. After completing three years of primary school in her village, in 1912 she enrolled in a school in Lublin, and then in a senior school in Chelm. 

After the beginning of World War I Kukharchuk relocated to Odesa, where she studied until 1919 and worked as a secretary. In 1919 she joined the Bolsheviks in Odesa. Kukharchuk fluently spoke French, Polish, Russian, Ukrainian as well as her native Lemko dialect and she became one of the leaders of the Young Communist League in Odesa, then occupied by the French. Kukharchuk and Taras Franko, the son of Ivan Franko, then joined the Galician party bureau, created at the order of Vladimir Lenin to spread Communist ideas among the Ukrainian Galician Army. In June 1920 she was appointed as an agitator to the Polish front and became the leader of the education department and of the women's department of the Central Committee of the Communist Party of Western Ukraine. Later that year Kukharchuk was sent to Moscow to continue her studies. 

In 1921 she became a teacher at a communist party school in Bakhmut, but soon became ill with typhus, and after recovery was moved to a similar school in Donetsk. There in 1922 Kukharchuk met Nikita Khrushchev, with whom she spent most of her remaining life. In 1926 Kukharchuk was again sent to Moscow, to study political economy, and after that taught at a party school in Kyiv. In Kyiv in 1929 she gave birth to Rada, her first child with Khrushchev. She also took care of Khrushchev's two children from his previous marriage, and when in 1930 Khrushchev was sent to Moscow, she followed him there. In Moscow, Kukharchuk lived with Khrushchev's parents and worked as a party leader at a lamp factory. In 1935 she gave birth to their son Sergei and in 1937 to their daughter Elena, who died aged 35 due to poor health.

In 1938 Khrushchev was appointed as the First Secretary of the Communist Party of Ukraine, and his family returned to Kyiv, but only three years later they were evacuated to Samara due to the German invasion of the Soviet Union.

After Khrushchev became the Soviet leader in 1953, Kukharchuk acted as the First Lady of Soviet Union, in a position that was non-existent with previous Soviet leaders. In contrast to her predecessors she accompanied Khrushchev in his foreign trips, took part in official events, and was de facto manager of Khrushchev's private life. She could communicate in five languages: Russian, Ukrainian, Polish, French and English, which she studied for many years in various Communist Party schools.

Kukharchuk and Khrushchev officially married only in 1965, after Khrushchev was retired from office. She spent the rest of her life in Zhukovka in Moscow Oblast. She died on 13 August 1984 at the age of 84.

References

External link

1900 births
1984 deaths
Khrushcheva
Spouses of Russian and Soviet national leaders
Ukrainian people in the Russian Empire
People from Lublin Governorate
People from Tomaszów Lubelski County
20th-century Ukrainian women